Ben Macdhui (also spelled Ben Macdui) is a  mountain in the Eastern Cape province of South Africa. It was named after Ben Macdui in Scotland. It is the highest peak in the Eastern Cape that is entirely within South Africa;  Ben MacDhui is the highest pass in South Africa

External links
   
 

Drakensberg
Mountains of the Eastern Cape